Karl Stallmeister (1884–?) was an Estonian politician. He was a member of I Riigikogu, representing the Estonian Independent Socialist Workers' Party. He was a member of the Riigikogu since 15 March 1922. He replaced Jaan Kalla. On 3 January 1923, he resigned his position and he was replaced by Aleksander Pärn.

References

1880s births
Year of death missing
Estonian Independent Socialist Workers' Party politicians
Members of the Riigikogu, 1920–1923